East Lancashire Vikings  are an amateur rugby league club based in Colne in Pendle. The team play home games at Colne & Nelson RUFC. Currently they play in the North West Premier division of the Rugby League Conference and the North West Merit League.

History
The club was formed in early 2010 by three friends whose aim was to help establish rugby league in east Lancashire.
The club were invited by Colne & Nelson RUFC to use their club as a base. Preliminary training commenced in early February 2010 with a view to things being officially launched in mid March. Widnes Vikings donated a kit to get the club off to a flying start.

After a 68-4 win in the semi, the Vikings moved on to the Grand Final against Ashton, the NW Counties Premier Division club.

East Lancashire Vikings secured a place at the highest level of the regional Summer Conference for 2011 with a place in the Premier Division. East Lancashire Vikings failed to complete the season in the North West Premier Division.

Coaching staff
Rod Steele (Head Coach)
Eddie Stephens (Head Coach)

Rugby League Conference teams
Rugby clubs established in 2010
Rugby league teams in Lancashire
English rugby league teams
2010 establishments in England